Teqüe Rugby Club is a rugby union and field hockey club from the city of Mendoza, Argentina. The rugby team currently plays in the regionalised Torneo del Oeste.

History
Teqüe Rugby Club was founded by former players and managers of Club Obras Sanitarias, on December 16, 1973.

The word Teqüe means "young Guanaco" in Araucanian language. Besides, a guanaco is the emblem of the Unión de Rugby de Cuyo. When Teqûe was founded, a young guanaco was adopted due to the club was the youngest in the region by then.

The first years Teqüe played in the Club Chacras de Coria field. The club has played matches against some of the most notable teams of Buenos Aires, such as SIC, San Cirano, Los Matreros. Teqüe also disputed international games facing Bordeaux Etudiants, Vascos de Baigorri and Stade Français (France), Birkenhead Park FC, Dauntsey's School (England), Garda (Ireland), University of Edinburg (Scotland), Walcha (Australia), Universidad Católica, Universidad de Chile and Chile national team.

References

External links
Official website

Argentine rugby union teams
Rugby clubs established in 1973
Sport in Mendoza, Argentina
1973 establishments in Argentina